Dragon Fist is 1979 Hong Kong action film starring Jackie Chan.

Dragon Fist may refer to:
Dragon Fist (manga), the Japanese manga by Shuu Katayama
Dragon Fist (Dungeons & Dragons), Dungeons & Dragons campaign setting
Dragon Fist Explosion!! If Goku Can't Do It, Who Will?, the thirteenth Dragon Ball Z feature movie, also known as Wrath Of The Dragon in Western countries. 
Dragon's fist, a Chinese melee weapon